Beavis and Butt-Head in Virtual Stupidity is a point-and-click adventure computer game based on the American animated television series created by Mike Judge, Beavis and Butt-Head, that was developed by ICOM Simulations and published by Viacom New Media. It was released on August 31, 1995.

It featured vocals from the series' cast of voice actors, including Mike Judge. Besides the main game, four mini-games are featured, called Hock-A-Loogie, Court Chaos, Bug Justice, and Air Guitar.

The main game plots the two main characters, Beavis and Butt-Head, trying to get into Todd's gang. Over the course of the game, they have to complete tasks and explore areas in the fictional town of Highland, Texas.

It was originally released on the PC. A CD-i port of Virtual Stupidity was planned but was cancelled due to falling sales of the console. A Sony PlayStation port was released exclusively in Japan in 1998 with dubbed voice acting by Owarai duo London Boots Ichi-gō Ni-gō.

Plot
The game starts with Beavis and Butt-Head working at Burger World. They are met by Todd, who threatens them. Despite this, Beavis and Butt-Head like Todd because of his power and consider him "cool." They decide to try to join Todd's gang.

At Highland High, the duo are forced to stay in Science Class and dissect a frog. Eventually, they manage to skip class after lying to the science teacher that they are going to the bathroom. They manage to slip from school after spitting on Principal McVicker from the school rooftop, causing him to leave the school entrance.

From then on, Beavis and Butt-Head explore various areas from Highland, including their house, BurgerWorld, the park, and Maxi-Mart, completing various tasks, in order to get closer to Todd and his gang.

Music videos
Three full-length music videos (with included commentary by Beavis and Butt-Head) are viewable on various television sets in the game:
 GWAR – "Saddam a Go-Go"
 Primus – "DMV"
 Sausage – "Riddles Are Abound Tonight"

Reception

According to senior artist Tom Zehner, Virtual Stupidity achieved sales above 100,000 units. The game was a commercial success.

Virtual Stupidity received mostly positive reviews from video game magazines and websites. It held a 76.86% average at GameRankings based on seven reviews. Reviewing the PC version, a reviewer for Next Generation said it "may be one of the funniest games to ever hit store shelves." He applauded the game for "flawlessly" recreating the look, sound, and humor of the TV show while having enough strong gameplay to make it stand on its own as an outstanding adventure game. He scored it 4 out of 5 stars.

PC Gamer US named Virtual Stupidity the best adventure game of 1995. The editors wrote, "This game is a textbook example of the right way to bring material from another medium to PC gaming." In 1998, the magazine declared it the 24th-best computer game ever released, and the editors called it "a great piece of adventure gaming".

References

External links
Official site
Beavis and Butt-Head in Virtual Stupidity at MobyGames
Beavis and Butt-Head in Virtual Stupidity at GameFAQs

1995 video games
Cancelled CD-i games
MTV video games
PlayStation (console) games
Point-and-click adventure games
ScummVM-supported games
Virtual Stupidity
Video games developed in the United States
Video games set in Texas
Windows games